Boris Levinson (Loewensohn) (1884-1947) was a Russian-born American composer.

Levenson was born on 22 March 1884 in Ackerman, Bessarabia (now Bilhorod-Dnistrovskyi, Ukraine, then a province of Russian Empire). Levenson became a pupil of Nikolai Rimsky-Korsakov, before becoming a prominent composer of his own right. A Bessarabian Jew, Levenson focused his work on Jewish folk songs. He traveled to the United States in 1920.

His musical output also includes a string quartet among other works. This was performed in a concert of his works in London, England in April, 1920.

He died in March 1947 in New York City.

Notes

American male composers
American composers
Russian Jews
1884 births
1947 deaths
Jewish American musicians
Russian composers
Russian male composers
20th-century American male musicians